The Borgward BE3000, later sold as Lloyd EL3000, was the electric drive version of the German military truck Borgward B 3000, a 6600 lb or 3000 kg mid class truck.

Since 1906, NAMAG and Borgward have developed electric vehicles up to 40 PS. In 1950, Borgward moved the production from Bremen to their other location in Hastedt, a district of Bremen-Hemelingen, and renamed the vehicle to Lloyd EL3000. The total production figure is not known, but about 30 vehicles of this type were built each year. The major customer was the British Army of the Rhine.

The truck had a range of 70 km (43 miles) loaded and 100 km (62 miles) unloaded. 7.50×20" tires were used. The turning radius was 13 m. In addition to the hydraulic brake, a motor shortcut circuit was installed to retard the vehicle electrically. The motor was manufactured by Lloyd Dynamowerke Bremen.

The later type EL3000 was an electric mail delivery vehicle, produced from parts of various manufacturers.

References 

Borgward BE3000
BE3000
Electric trucks
Vehicles introduced in 1945